Azzouzi is a surname. Notable people with the surname include:
Saad El Azzouzi (born 1997), Moroccan surfer and basketball player.
Azzedine Azzouzi (born 1947), Algerian middle-distance runner
Badreddine Azzouzi (born 1996), Belgian footballer
Rachid Azzouzi (born 1971), Moroccan footballer
Yassin El-Azzouzi (born 1983), French-Moroccan footballer
Zakaria El Azzouzi (born 1996), Dutch-born Moroccan footballer